The City of St. Louis was a streamlined passenger train operated by the Union Pacific Railroad and the Wabash Railroad between St. Louis, Missouri and Los Angeles, California. It operated from 1946 to 1971.

History 
The City of St. Louis began operating on June 2, 1946 between St. Louis, Missouri and Cheyenne, Wyoming, where its cars were switched to other Union Pacific trains to continue west to the Pacific coast. In April 1951 it became a separate train from St. Louis to Los Angeles, California, skipping Cheyenne; it still carried some cars to switch to trains to other coast cities. In 1964 it was combined with the City of Los Angeles west of Ogden, Utah, and in 1968 with the City of San Francisco from Cheyenne to Ogden.

Between St. Louis and Kansas City the train ran on the Wabash Railroad, then on the Norfolk & Western which leased the Wabash in 1964. This part of the run became a separate train on June 19, 1968, retaining the City of St Louis name until its discontinuance in April 1969; after June 1968 the Union Pacific train was the City of Kansas City, which lasted until Amtrak took over on May 1, 1971.

Major stations, 1951
St. Louis 
Kansas City
Topeka, Kansas
Denver
Ogden
Branch to Oakland/San Francisco via the Southern Pacific:
Reno
Sacramento
Oakland (ferry connection to San Francisco)
Branch to Los Angeles:
Salt Lake City
San Bernandino
Riverside
Los Angeles
Branch to Portland & Seattle:
Pocatello
Boise
Nampa
Portland
Tacoma
Seattle

Equipment 
The original 1946 version of the train required three consists to protect its schedule. The consists contained a mix of heavyweight and lightweight equipment:
 Heavyweight baggage-mail (UP #5808-#5810)
 Three lightweight 48-seat coaches (UP #5331-#5365)
 Heavyweight dining car (UP #4627, UP #4629, or WAB #32)
 Heavyweight club-lounge (UP #1540, #1543, or #1544)
 Heavyweight 10-section, 1-drawing room, 1-compartment sleeping car
 Lightweight 4-compartment, 2-drawing room, 4-double bedroom sleeping car (UP Lakeside, Palos Verdes, or Verdugo)
 Lightweight 6-section, 6-roomette, 4-double bedroom sleeping car (UP American Army, American Monitor, or American Trooper)
 Heavyweight postal car (UP 2200-series)
The 10-1-1 sleeping car operated through to Portland, Oregon; cars used in this service included Balsam Fir, Douglas Fir, Inland Empire, Pinion Pine, Poudre Lake and Silver Spruce. The 6-4-4 sleeping car operated through to Los Angeles. The 2200-series postal car was added in Denver, Colorado for Cheyenne.

References

 Kratville, William W. and Ranks, Harold E., The Union Pacific Streamliners.  Kratville Publications, 1974.
 Stout, Greg, Route of the Eagles:  Missouri Pacific in the Streamlined Era.  Kansas City, White River Productions, 1995.
 Thomas, Lawrence, "Going to California on the Overland Route", TRRA Historical Society magazine, Spring/Summer 1996.

Named passenger trains of the United States
Night trains of the United States
Passenger rail transportation in Missouri
Passenger trains of the Norfolk and Western Railway
Passenger trains of the Union Pacific Railroad
Passenger trains of the Wabash Railroad
Railway services introduced in 1946
Railway services discontinued in 1971